De Filippi is an Italian surname. Notable people with the surname include:

 Filippo De Filippi (1814-1867), Italian zoologist and physician 
 Filippo De Filippi (explorer) (1869-1938), Italian explorer and physician 
 Maria De Filippi (born 1961), Italian television host
 José María De Filippi (born 1982), Argentine footballer
 Ludovico De Filippi (1872-1918), Italian naval officer

See also
 De Filippo, a surname

Italian-language surnames